ZhuZhu Pets (formerly known as Go Go Pets in the UK) is an American line of plush robotic hamster toys created by Cepia LLC in 2009. Multiple spin-off toy lines, including ZhuZhu Puppies and Kung Zhus, have been released.

History
 
ZhuZhu Pets were created by Russ Hornsby for his St. Louis company, Cepia LLC. The name comes from Mandarin zhūzhū, meaning "little pig." In late 2009 Cepia employed only 16 people in the U.S. and 30 in China.

The original ZhuZhu Pets are nine different characters, with names including Chunk, PipSqueak, Mr. Squiggles, and Num Nums. There are various accessories for creating customized hamster habitats. ZhuZhu Pets can be put in either of two play modes: "nurturing mode," in which they coo and purr, or "adventure mode," in which they explore their habitat and respond to various stimuli.

ZhuZhu Pets were a craze during the 2009 holidays. They originally retailed for $9 USD, but for a time they sold for over $100 because of shortages.

In December 2009, testing done by the consumer organisation GoodGuide was initially thought to have found more than the allowed level of the toxic, silvery metalloid antimony in the Mr. Squiggles toy. After a review, regulators from the U.S. Consumer Product Safety Commission said that the toy was within the "very protective" standard. GoodGuide subsequently issued an apology saying that their testing methods (which checked for surface toxins) were different from the federal standards (which check for soluble toxins.)

Cepia encourages collecting of ZhuZhu Pets. Exclusive pets have been released in collaboration with Hallmark, Build-A-Bear Workshop, and Toys "R" Us. In early 2010 a set of new characters was released, including the Rockstar pets (Roxie, Ryder, Pax, and Kingston), inspired by the children of celebrities such as Angelina Jolie and Gwen Stefani. In mid-2010 the Kung Zhu line of battling hamsters was released, aimed at boys age 8–12. In December 2010 the ZhuZhu Princess series was released, as was a line of sixteen Burger King toys. Also released in 2010 were the first edition of ZhuZhu Babies, which are not electronic or plush, but plastic toys articulated with a small ball under their belly. The second 2011 edition of ZhuZhu Babies included motors. A clone of Zhu Zhu Pets emerged during 2010 called Furry Frenzies, which featured other animals. This inspired Zhu Zhu Pets to release non-hamster spinoff lines starting in 2011 when several dog breeds of Zhu Zhu Puppies were introduced. They are plush robotic puppies that move around and bark. In 2012, a safari line called Zhufari, a line of ponies called Zhu Zhu Ponies, and four Happy meal toys were released that were based on Quest for Zhu that were only sold in some countries excluding The U.S. 
The franchise was quietly discontinued sometime in 2013.

Zhu Zhu Pets was rebooted when an animated series, now known as The ZhuZhus, debuted as "Polly and the ZhuZhu Pets" on September 12, 2016 on the Disney Channel in the United States. Starting February 2017, Spin Master showcased the ZhuZhu Pets franchise in a toy fair with new toy designs, based more on the TV series.

In 2018, ZhuZhu Pets got discontinued again. and it's replaced by Polly Pocket since 2018.

Video games
In 2010 the first ZhuZhu Pets video game was released for Nintendo DS, iPhone, and PC. The sequel, ZhuZhu Pets 2: Featuring The Wild Bunch, was also released for Nintendo DS  and Wii, as well as ZhuZhu Pets: Kung Zhu for Nintendo DS. In 2011 ZhuZhu Princess: Carriages & Castles ZhuZhu Babies and ZhuZhu Puppies were released for Nintendo DS.

Films
Cepia LLC created The Dream Garden Company for 4 films with distribution by Universal Pictures. On September 27, 2011, the franchise's first full-length feature film Quest for Zhu was released straight-to-DVD. A second full-length feature film, The Power of Zhu, probably in the works and has a trailer, potentially being released on DVD sometime in 2012 as well as a third film The Secret of Zhu that featured the voices of Brad Garrett and Ken Jeong and fourth film Journey to GloE. However, as of February 2014, no other films or even plans for films have been released for "The Power of Zhu", although it was completed and was "secretly distributed" to TV stations in France and Brazil under the title "Amazing Adventures of Zhu".

See also
 The ZhuZhus
FurReal Friends
Hatchimal

References

External links
 

Fictional hamsters
2000s toys
2010s toys
Electronic toys
Entertainment robots
Stuffed toys
Toy animals
2000s fads and trends